Boronia coriacea is a plant in the citrus family, Rutaceae and is endemic to a small area in the south-west of Western Australia. It is a small shrub with pinnate leaves and hairless pink, four-petalled flowers in small clusters on the ends of the branches.

Description
The eight stamens are club-shaped and erect, those nearest the sepals slightly longer than the stigma. Flowering occurs in April or from October to November.

Taxonomy and naming
Boronia coriacea was first formally described in 1971 by Paul G. Wilson and the description was published in Nuytsia from a specimen collected on the road to Israelite Bay. The specific epithet (coriacea) is a Latin word meaning "leathery".

Distribution and habitat
This boronia grows is only known from the type locality where it grows in heath and in mallee vegetation.

Conservation
Boronia coriacea is classified as "Priority Two" by the Government of Western Australia Department of Parks and Wildlife meaning that it is poorly known and known from only a few locations but is not under imminent threat.

References

coriacea
Flora of Western Australia
Plants described in 1971
Taxa named by Paul G. Wilson